Golden Soak is a 1979 Australian-British mini series about an English mining engineer who travels to Australia. It was based on the 1973 book of the same title written by Hammond Innes.

Cast

 Ray Barrett - Alec Hamilton
 Elizabeth Alexander - Janet Garrety
 Bill Hunter - Chris Culpin
 Christiane Kruger - Rosa Hamilton
 David Cameron - Johnny Culpin
 Ruth Cracknell - Prophesy

References

External links
Golden Soak at IMDb
Golden Soak at AustLit

1970s Australian television miniseries
1979 Australian television series debuts
Films directed by Henri Safran
English-language television shows
1979 Australian television series endings
1970s British television miniseries